Shahin Zakiyev (born on 11 June 1999) is an Azerbaijani football goalkeeper who plays for Sabail in the Azerbaijan Premier League.

Club career
On 18 April 2019, Zakiyev made his debut in the Azerbaijan Premier League for Keşla match against Qarabağ.

References

External links
 

1999 births
Living people
Association football goalkeepers
Azerbaijani footballers
Azerbaijan youth international footballers
Azerbaijan under-21 international footballers
Azerbaijan Premier League players
Shamakhi FK players
Sabail FK players